Alexei Borisovich Troschinsky (born October 9, 1973) is a Kazakhstani former professional ice hockey defenceman.

Career statistics

Regular season and playoffs

International

External links

1973 births
Living people
Barys Nur-Sultan players
Atlant Moscow Oblast players
Ice hockey players at the 1998 Winter Olympics
Kazakhstani ice hockey defencemen
Kazzinc-Torpedo players
Olympic ice hockey players of Kazakhstan
Sportspeople from Oskemen
Soviet ice hockey defencemen
Torpedo Nizhny Novgorod players
Kazakhstani expatriate sportspeople in Russia
Kazakhstani expatriate ice hockey people
Expatriate ice hockey players in Russia